Asura disticha is a moth of the family Erebidae first described by Edward Meyrick in 1894. It is found in Myanmar.

References

disticha
Moths described in 1894
Moths of Asia